Tin Sau is an MTR Light Rail stop. It is located at ground level at the junction of Tin Sau Road and Tin Kwai Road, near Vianni Cove, in Tin Shui Wai, Yuen Long District. It began service on 7 December 2003 and belongs to Zone 5A.

References

MTR Light Rail stops
Former Kowloon–Canton Railway stations
Tin Shui Wai
Railway stations in Hong Kong opened in 2003
2003 establishments in Hong Kong